North Sweden is a NUTS 1 region in Sweden.

References 

NUTS 1 statistical regions of the European Union
Geography of Sweden